Chandrawal-2 is a Haryanvi language film released on 4 April 2012. It is a sequel to superhit Chandrawal film.

Cast

Production 
After announcements of the sequel to superhit Chandrawal film, shootings began on 11 October 2011 near Raipur Rani in Panchkula District, Haryana. With financial issue makers including the lead actress in its first part as co-producer in sequel Usha Sharma borrowed a loan and sold her ornaments.

The film was released on 4 April 2012.

References 

Haryanvi-language films